Somaliland–United Kingdom relations refers to the relationship between the Republic of Somaliland and the United Kingdom of Great Britain and Northern Ireland. Somaliland maintains a representative (liaison) offices in the United Kingdom and the United Kingdom also maintains a representative office in Hargeisa.

History 

In April 2014, the Sheffield City Council in the United Kingdom voted to recognise the right to self-determination of Somaliland, the second British city council to do so, with Bristol being the first. The gesture however was ceremonial and not legally binding. On 26 March 2015, Cardiff City Council followed suit and later on 18 May 2015, the UK Independence Party announced their support for the recognition of Somaliland. This was followed by the Conservative UK government's official opening of a British Office in Hargeisa, the capital of Somaliland. In July 2019, the Birmingham City Council recognised the right to self-determination of Somaliland, becoming the 5th in Britain. In 2020, the United Kingdom, Denmark and the Netherlands approved four agreements with the government of Somaliland to improve critical infrastructure to support economic growth.

See also 

 Foreign relations of Somaliland
 Foreign relations of the United Kingdom

References 

 
United Kingdom
Somaliland
Relations of colonizer and former colony